Radio 2 Live (formally known as Radio 2 Live in Hyde Park and Radio 2's Festival in a Day) is a British music festival that took place from 2011 to 2019 in Hyde Park in London, and it was due to be held in Leeds in September 2022, but it was cancelled due to the sad and tragic death of Elizabeth II.

The idea behind the event was for music fans who enjoy live music but are not comfortable with the idea of a full multi-day festival to be able to experience the variety of artists and the atmosphere that such a festival would offer, without the associated necessities such as camping. The festival is designed to appeal to the over 35 demographic that makes up the majority of BBC Radio 2 listeners, although the event attracts fans of all ages. The line-up is compiled of the various adult contemporary music and specialist genres featured on Radio 2, including folk, country, soul, rock and jazz. The festival was hosted by Chris Evans and later Jo Whiley alongside other Radio 2 presenters and is broadcast live on the station and streamed on the BBC Red Button.

In June 2022, the corporation announced that the festival will be moving away from London, with the 2022 festival set to be held over two days at Temple Newsam Park in Leeds, but it was cancelled following the sad and tragic death of Elizabeth II.

In 2017, the attendance was 45,000.

About the festival
Gary Barlow was the first artist to headline the festival twice: at the inaugural event in 2011 and as part of Take That in 2017.
Kylie Minogue was the first female headliner, performing in 2018
James Blunt (2011, 2013 and 2017), Status Quo (2014, 2016 and 2019) and Emeli Sandé (2012, 2017) are the only artists to perform at the festival three times, and Emeli two times.
Jessie J was the only artist to appear at the festival over consecutive years (2012 and 2013).
Other artists who have appeared multiple times are Bellowhead (2011, 2014), Paloma Faith (2012, 2014), Will Young (2011, 2015), Gregory Porter (2014, 2016), Blondie (2014, 2017), Lenny Kravitz (2011, 2018), The Shires (2015, 2018), Manic Street Preachers (2013, 2018), Mick Hucknall (2012 and 2019), Beverley Knight (2011 and 2019), Simple Minds (2013), Bananarama (2019), Mark Owen (2017,) and Chic (2011).

Hosts

Chris Evans
Jo Whiley
Michael Ball
Simon Mayo
Ken Bruce
Johnnie Walker
Zoe Ball
Claudia Winkleman
Jeremy Vine
Trevor Nelson
Vanessa Feltz
Clare Balding
Tony Blackburn
Bob Harris
Sara Cox
Mark Radcliffe
Clare Teal
Angela Scanlon
OJ Borg
Dermot O'Leary
Suzi Perry
Anneka Rice
Gary Davies
Ricky Wilson
Richie Anderson

Performers

Live in Hyde Park 2011
The inaugural festival in a day was held on 11 September 2011. Lionel Richie was originally set to headline the event but was forced to cancel due to ill health.

Live in Hyde Park 2012
The 2012 festival in a day was held on 9 September.

Live in Hyde Park 2013
The 2013 festival in a day was held on 8 September.

Live in Hyde Park 2014
The 2014 festival in a day was held on 14 September.

Live in Hyde Park 2015
The 2015 festival in a day was held on 13 September. 
The line-up was revealed by Chris Evans between 8 and 12 June.

Live in Hyde Park 2016
The 2016 festival in a day was be held on 11 September. It also featured a DJ set by Craig Charles and a special edition of PopMaster with Ken Bruce.

Live in Hyde Park 2017
The 2017 festival in a day was held on 10 September. The line-up was announced on 6 June by Chris Evans, with tickets for the event going on sale on 8 June. Between the main acts, the festival also featured a special edition of PopMaster with Ken Bruce, Sounds of the 80s with Sara Cox, A Question of Radio 2 with Clare Balding, Jeremy Vine, Fearne Cotton, Jon Culshaw and Rev. Kate Bottley plus live DJ sets from Craig Charles and Ana Matronic.

Live in Hyde Park 2018
The 2018 festival in a day was held on 9 September. Carrie Underwood was originally scheduled to perform but had to pull out due to illness and was replaced by The Shires. The festival featured a special edition of PopMaster with Ken Bruce and Sounds of the 80s with Gary Davies plus a DJ set from Craig Charles. During the headline set, Rick Astley and Jason Donovan appeared as special guests.

Live in Hyde Park 2019
The 2019 festival in a day was held on 15 September. Two acts were announced each day by Zoe Ball starting on Monday 3 June 2019, with the headliners being revealed on Thursday 6 June. Emeli Sandé was originally scheduled to perform but cancelled on the day due to having lost her voice. Her set was replaced by a Craig Charles DJ set. There was also a DJ set from Gary Davies. During the headlining set, Olly Alexander and Beverley Knight appeared as special guests.

Live in Hyde Park 2020

This year's Live in Hyde Park will be a virtual affair due to coronavirus.

On 12 and 13 September 2020, the BBC will air new sets recorded from home by Sheryl Crow, Nile Rodgers and Chic featuring Rebecca Ferguson, Craig David, Erasure, Sir Tom Jones, The Killers, John Legend, McFly, Gregory Porter and The Pretenders. Several past performances by Sir Elton John, Jeff Lynne, Kylie Minogue, Pet Shop Boys, Rita Ora, Sir Rod Stewart, Shania Twain, Smokey Robinson and Take That were also made available to watch on BBC iPlayer.

Radio 2 Live in Leeds 2022
Following two cancelled years due to the COVID-19 pandemic, it was announced on 5 April 2022 that the event was to be rebranded as Radio 2 Live 2022 and would take place in Leeds at Temple Newsam on 17 and 18 September. The line-up was announced on 14 September by Zoe Ball, revealing that Simple Minds would be headlining the event. Ball also stated that two additional acts would be announced in the following weeks On 2 August, Robbie Williams and the BBC Concert Orchestra were revealed as the second headliner alongside Elbow and the Radio 2 DJ line-up, which features Richie Anderson, Sara Cox, Rylan Clark, DJ Spoony, Jo Whiley, Dermot O'Leary, Gary Davies, Trevor Nelson, Tony Blackburn, Kate Bottley, and OJ Borg.

But the event was cancelled following the sad and tragic death of Queen Elizabeth II the previous day.

References

Music festivals in London
Hyde Park, London
BBC Radio 2
Festivals established in 2011